The pearly gates are a conceptual entry to Heaven in Christian religions.

Pearly Gates may also refer to:
 Pearly Gates (album), a 1999 album by Jughead's Revenge
 Pearly Gates (guitar), a 1959 Gibson Les Paul owned by Billy Gibbons
 Pearly Gates (record label)
 Pearly Gates (singer), an American soul singer and member of the Flirtations
 "Pearly Gates" (song), a 2010 song by Pitbull
"Pearly Gates", a song by Iron Butterfly from Scorching Beauty
"Pearly Gates", a song by Silkworm from Blueblood
"Pearly Gates", a song by Prefab Sprout from Protest Songs
 Pearly Gates, a character in the 1963 film The Wrong Arm of the Law
 Pearly Gates (film), an American stage musical and film by Scott Ehrlich

See also
 Pearly Gatecrashers, an Australian band
 Heaven's Door (disambiguation)